Petre Daniel Ivanovici (born 2 March 1990) is a Romanian professional footballer who plays as a midfielder for Romanian club Minaur Baia Mare.

Notes

Honours
FC Voluntari
Romanian Cup: 2016–17
Romanian Supercup: 2017

References

External links 

Romanian League Profile

Living people
1990 births
Sportspeople from Timișoara
Association football midfielders
Romanian footballers
Vác FC players
Liga I players
FC Botoșani players
FC Voluntari players
CS Concordia Chiajna players
Liga II players
FC CFR Timișoara players
FCV Farul Constanța players
SSU Politehnica Timișoara players
FK Csíkszereda Miercurea Ciuc players
CS Minaur Baia Mare (football) players
Romanian expatriate footballers
Romanian expatriate sportspeople in Hungary
Expatriate footballers in Hungary